Old Iron Works, Mells (Fussells' Lower Works) is a 0.25 hectare biological Site of Special Scientific Interest, in the Wadbury Valley, south of the village of Mells in Somerset, notified in 1987. The site is a ruined iron works, which mainly produced agricultural edge-tools that were exported all over the world, and is now, in addition to its unique and major importance in relation to industrial archaeology, used as a breeding site by horseshoe bats. The block of buildings adjacent to the entrance is listed Grade II* and most of the rest of the site is a Scheduled Ancient Monument. It is included in the Heritage at Risk Register produced by English Heritage.

Biological interest 
The site is used by both Greater and Lesser Horseshoe Bats. The roofspace of one of the former works building was used, before the building burnt down in the 1980s, as a breeding roost in summer by large numbers of Greater Horseshoes and smaller numbers of Lesser Horseshoes. Disused flues and tunnels in a low cliff are used for hibernation.

History 
It is likely that there was some form of foundry on or near the site since about 1500 when Mells seems to have been known as Iron Burgh. There are further documentary records which indicate that iron working had been undertaken locally since at least the early 13th century.

The land on which the Lower Works were built was leased by John Horner (an alleged descendant of Little Jack Horner) to James Fussell III of Stoke Lane, on 25 December 1744, to erect "a good, firme and substantiall Mill or Mills for Grinding Edge Tools and forging Iron plates". His son, James Fussell IV further developed the business. At one time it employed 250 people on this site and continued for many years, with various members of the Fussell family operating a total of six sites in the local area: the Upper Works further up the Wadbury Valley, the Great Elm Edge-Tool Works, the Chantry Works, the Railford Works and a small site at Gurney Slade. Tools produced by Fussells were exported to Europe and America, and the family expanded its activities to include coal mining and banking, with the business issuing its own banknotes at one stage.

The business declined towards the end of the 19th century, due in part to a failure to convert from water to steam power until a late stage, and also to the collapse of English agriculture in the 1870s. By 1895 production had ceased, and the company folded in 1900.

Many of the old photographs, diagrams, plans and tools are now exhibited at Frome Museum.

References

External links 
 Fussells Iron Industry Society website
 Natural England website (SSSI information)
 Site boundary at Nature on the Map website
 Somerset Historic Environment Record for the site

Sites of Special Scientific Interest in Somerset
Sites of Special Scientific Interest notified in 1987
Ironworks and steelworks in England
Scheduled monuments in Mendip District
Industrial archaeological sites in Somerset
Industrial buildings in England
Structures on the Heritage at Risk register in Somerset
Mells, Somerset